The following is a list of events affecting Canadian television in 1960. Events listed include television show debuts, finales, cancellations, and channel launches.

Notable events
April 24-CBC opened French-language station CBWFT in Winnipeg
September 9-CFCN-TV was inaugurated in Calgary
September 23-CHSA-TV was inaugurated in Lloydminster, Alberta, and later became CKSA-TV
October 31-CHAN-TV opened in Vancouver
November 7-Bobinette makes her first appearance in that day’s episode of Bobino, which was the first episode of its fourth season.
November 12-CJAY-TV opened in Winnipeg. It later became CKY-TV

Births 
June 22 – Catherine Disher, British born Canadian actress and voice actress

Television shows

Debuts

Canadian Broadcasting Corporation 
April 2-Reflections (1960–62) 
June 8-First Person (1960-1961)
July 8-Red River Jamboree (1960-1965)
September 21-The Nation's Business (1960-)
September 26-The Jack Kane Show (1960-1961)
October 2-The World of Music (1960-1961)
October 6
Klondike (1960-1961)
Midnight Zone (1960-1962)
October 10-Festival (1960-1969)
October 17
Junior Roundup (1960-1961)
The Verdict is Yours (1960-1961)
October 18
Club 6 (1960-1962)
Music Break (1960-1962)
October 20-Music in Miniature (1960-1968)
November 6-The Nature of Things (1960-1983)
December 26-Inquiry (1960-1964)

SRC

Television shows on air

CBC
Country Canada (1954-2007)
CBC News Magazine (1952-1981) 
The National (1954–present) 
The C.G.E. Show (1952-1959) 
Circle 8 Ranch (1955-1978)
Front Page Challenge (1957-1995)
Hockey Night in Canada (1952–present)
Maggie Muggins (1955–1962)
Open House (1952-1962)
Wayne and Shuster Show (1958-1989)

SRC
Chez Hélène (1959-1973)

Television stations

Debuts

Births 
August 10 -- Steven Ogg, actor

See also
1960 in Canada 
List of Canadian films

References

External links
CBC Directory of Television Series at Queen’s University (Archived March 4, 2016)